Busingye Peninah Kabingani (born 1944) is a Ugandan politician and legislator.  She represents the Elderly of Uganda's central region as MP in the parliament of Uganda. She is a member of the National Resistance Movement (NRM) on whose ticket she was voted into parliament in the 2021 Uganda general elections.

Background 
Kabingani, commonly known as Mama Kisanja, is a resident of Kira municipality in Wakiso district.

Kabingani won the seat for Elderly MP central region on the NRM ticket with 113 votes against her closest rival Halima Namakula who came second from the elders electoral college, composed of delegates of elders from 27 districts of the central region.

Career 

Kabingani is a farmer and retired civil servant who worked with East African railways that later morphed into Uganda railways after the disintegration of the first east African community.

She has been actively engaged in political mobilization for close to 58 year, she is also the treasurer of Wakiso district Elderly league.

She currently represents the Elderly of central region in the parliament of Uganda.

References 

21st-century Ugandan women politicians
21st-century Ugandan politicians
Women members of the Parliament of Uganda
Members of the Parliament of Uganda
Living people
1944 births